Walmu was a king of Wilusa in the late 13th century BC. He is known from the Milawata letter, which reports that he had been deposed and discusses the Hittites' intent to reinstall him. The letter does not specify how Walmu was deposed or who was responsible.

See also
Ahhiyawa
Historicity of the Iliad
Karabel relief
Kings of Wilusa
Seha River Land

References

Troy
 
Kings of Wilusa
Trojan War
Hittite Empire
Ancient Near East
Mycenaean Greece